The 2019 National Camogie League, known for sponsorship reasons as the Littlewoods Ireland Camogie Leagues, took place in early 2019.

Galway won Division 1, defeating Kilkenny in the final.

Format

League structure
The 2019 National Camogie League consists of three divisions: 10 in Division 1, 15 in Division 2 and 6 in Division 3; division 1 is divided into two groups and Division 2 is divided into three groups. Each team plays every other team in its group once. 3 points are awarded for a win and 1 for a draw.

If two teams are level on points, the tie-break is:
 winners of the head-to-head game are ranked ahead
 if the head-to-head match was a draw, ranking is determined by the points difference (i.e. total scored minus total conceded in all games)
 if the points difference is equal, ranking is determined by the total scored

If three or more teams are level on league points, rankings are determined solely by points difference.

Finals 
The top two teams in each group in Division 1 contest the National Camogie League semi-finals.

In Division 2, the three group winners and runners-up contest the quarter-finals; the three quarter-final winners then play a semi-final and final.

The top four teams in Division 3 contest the Division 3 semi-finals.

Fixtures and results

Division 1

Group 1

Group 2

Wexford gave a walkover to Cork and were deducted three points. Because of this, score difference in games involving Wexford are not included when calculating overall score difference.

Relegation playoff

Finals

Division 2

Finals

Division 3

Finals

References

League
National Camogie League seasons